Choe Jun (1884–1970) was a businessman and philanthropist in early 20th-century Korea. He was born in Gyeongju, in present-day South Korea. His family, known as the "Choe Bujatjip," had been known since the 17th century for their wealth and public-spiritedness. After the liberation of Korea in 1945, he gave much of his fortune to the Yeungnam University Foundation. He spent his later years in Suji, Yongin (Gyeonggi province).

See also
List of people of Korean descent

Korean philanthropists
20th-century Korean businesspeople
People from Gyeongju
1884 births
1970 deaths
Gyeongju Choe clan
Yeungnam University people
20th-century philanthropists